Mike Petke (born January 30, 1976) is an American former soccer player and coach who was most recently head coach of Major League Soccer club Real Salt Lake. Prior to his tenure with Real Salt Lake, he was head coach of the New York Red Bulls, leading them to the Supporters' Shield in 2013.

Playing career

College
Petke attended St. John the Baptist Diocesan High School in West Islip, New York, where he was selected as an All-American, before moving on to play college soccer in Southern Connecticut State University. In 1995, he led SCSU to the NCAA Division II National title and was named Conference Rookie of the Year. In 1997, he was named New England Collegiate Conference (NECC) Defensive Player of the Year and was a consensus NSCAA/Umbro First Team All-America selection.

Professional
Petke was drafted by the MetroStars in the first round of the 1998 MLS College Draft. He made his MLS debut on April 17, 1998 in a 1–0 win over Chicago Fire. He spent the first five years of his career with MetroStars, becoming the only constant under an ever-changing regime of coaches and players. A fan favorite, Petke ended his career as the MetroStars/Red Bulls all-time leader in games played with 169 (197 in all competitions).

Petke gained notoriety on August 20, 2000, four days after Tampa Bay Mutiny forward Mamadou Diallo broke the ribs of MetroStars goalkeeper Mike Ammann. Petke, who rarely scored goals, scored in the MetroStars win over Colorado, and unveiled a T-shirt that said August 16: Crime of the Century on the front and Revenge is Coming on the back. While such support for a fallen comrade was welcomed by teammates and MetroStars fans, it was frowned upon by the league and Petke was fined for his efforts. Diallo, however, received no disciplinary action following the injuries to Ammann.

After an outstanding season in 2000, in which Petke helped lead the club to the Eastern Division title, Petke went on a two-week trial with Bundesliga side Bayern Munich. After his trial with Bayern, another German club FC Kaiserslautern offered Petke a contract, but Petke elected to remain with MetroStars.

Petke, a three-time MLS All-Star, was traded to D.C. United with a draft pick and an allocation for Eddie Pope, Jaime Moreno, and Richie Williams. He won the MLS Cup with DC during the 2004 season. Petke was then traded to Colorado Rapids in May 2005 in a three-team deal. He helped stabilize the Colorado backline and was a key player in helping the Rapids reach the Western Conference Finals in 2005. He remained a fixture in the heart of the Rapids defense for the next three years.

On November 26, 2008, the New York Red Bulls, the former MetroStars, signed Petke on waivers, and agreed to terms on a new multi-year agreement. The move brought Petke back to New York six years after leaving the MetroStars. In his first season with the Red Bulls, Petke appeared in 19 regular season matches. On March 20, 2010, Petke scored the second goal for the Red Bulls in a 3–1 victory against Santos FC, which was the first match played at the new Red Bull Arena.
During the 2010 season Petke announced that he would retire at the end of the season. He concluded his last professional season appearing in 16 regular season matches, and helped New York capture its second Eastern Division regular season title. In thirteen years in MLS, Petke scored thirteen regular season goals and added four assists.

International
Petke had two caps with the U.S. national team, the first coming on June 7, 2001, against Ecuador.

Petke also captained the United States Under-21 team, and was a member of the U.S. squad that competed in the 1995 World University Games in Japan.

Coaching career
After retiring from the game, Petke took a job as Manager of Business Operations with the New York Red Bulls. On January 24, 2013, after tenures as an assistant coach and then interim head coach, Petke was named as the club's head coach. In the 2013 MLS season, Petke guided the Red Bulls to their first major trophy, clinching the Supporters' Shield with a final matchday 5–2 win over the Chicago Fire.

Petke once again led the Red Bulls to relative success in the 2014 MLS season, as the team made the playoffs and advanced to the Eastern Conference Finals, losing there to the New England Revolution. Nonetheless, Petke was fired by the club in January 2015. Petke's firing was met with huge backlash by Red Bulls supporters.

After leaving the Red Bulls, Petke spent time as a color commentator for soccer on ONE World Sports, and also worked as the Director of Coaching for the New Jersey State Youth Soccer Association.

Petke was hired as head coach of Real Monarchs in the United Soccer League on December 22, 2016. Just over three months later, on March 29, 2017, Petke was named the new head coach of the Monarchs' parent club, Real Salt Lake, replacing Jeff Cassar.

On August 11, 2019, Real Salt Lake announced that it had terminated Petke's contract as head coach, following an incident between Petke and match officials during the 2019 Leagues Cup where he was accused of repeatedly using homophobic language toward the head official.

Career statistics

Coaching statistics

Honors

Playing honors
D.C. United
MLS Cup (1): 2004

Coaching honors
New York Red Bulls
MLS Supporters' Shield (1): 2013

References

External links
 
 Red Bulls coaching profile

1976 births
Living people
American soccer players
American soccer coaches
New York Red Bulls players
D.C. United players
Colorado Rapids players
People from Long Island
United States men's international soccer players
Southern Connecticut Fighting Owls men's soccer players
Soccer players from New York (state)
Major League Soccer players
Major League Soccer All-Stars
New York Red Bulls draft picks
New York Red Bulls coaches
New York Red Bulls non-playing staff
People from Islip (town), New York
Association football defenders
Real Salt Lake coaches
Real Monarchs coaches
St. John the Baptist Diocesan High School alumni